Ludvig Nilsson (born March 28, 1994) is a Swedish ice hockey player. He is currently playing with the Växjö Lakers of the Swedish Hockey League (SHL).

Nilsson made his Elitserien (now the SHL) debut playing with Timrå IK during the 2012–13 Elitserien season.

Awards and honours

References

External links

1994 births
Living people
Almtuna IS players
Brynäs IF players
Modo Hockey players
Ice hockey people from Stockholm
Swedish ice hockey forwards
Timrå IK players
Växjö Lakers players